Scorpion men ( or aqrabuamelu) are featured in several Akkadian language myths, including the Enûma Elish and the Babylonian version of the Epic of Gilgamesh. The Scorpion Men are described to have the head, torso, and arms of a man and the body of a scorpion.

Mythology
They were first created by Tiamat in order to wage war against the younger gods for the murder of her mate Apsu. In the Epic of Gilgamesh, they stand guard outside the gates of the sun god Shamash at the mountains of Mashu. These give entrance to Kurnugi, the land of darkness. The scorpion men open the doors for Shamash as he travels out each day, and close the doors after him when he returns to the underworld at night. They also warn travellers of the danger that lies beyond their post. Their heads touch the sky, their "terror is awesome" and their "glance is death". This meeting of Gilgamesh, on his way to Utnapishtim, with the Scorpion-folk guarding the entrance to the tunnel is described in Iškār Gilgāmeš, tablet IX, lines 47–81.

See also

 Scorpion goddess

Notes

External links

 Graphic of Scorpion man (From boundary stone: Kudurru). Pictured in register IV-(row IV). (Article with Detail-graphic) 

Epic of Gilgamesh
Characters in the Enūma Eliš
Mythological arthropods
Mesopotamian legendary creatures
Mythological human hybrids
Anthropomorphic animals
Offspring of Tiamat
Scorpions in culture